Georg Stöhr (21 May 1885 – 29 March 1977) was a German fencer. He competed at the 1908 and 1912 Summer Olympics.

References

1885 births
1977 deaths
German male fencers
Olympic fencers of Germany
Fencers at the 1908 Summer Olympics
Fencers at the 1912 Summer Olympics